Kempten is a locality of the municipality of Wetzikon in the canton of Zurich in Switzerland.

Geography
Kempten is located in the district of Hinwil in the Zürcher Oberland nearby the southeastern shore of the Pfäffikersee (Lake Pfäffikon).

Demographics
Kempten belongs politically to the municipality of Wetzikon.

Transportation
Kempten railway station is a stop of the S-Bahn Zürich on the line S3. The train station was built in 1903. The bus line operator Verkehrsbetriebe Zürichsee und Oberland (VZO) provides its services for the regions of the Oberland and the upper northeastern Lake Zurich shore.

Points of interest
In Kempten (lat. Cambodunum) the remains of a Roman villa rustica and the so-called Malermuseum are situated.

References

External links

 Official website of the municipality of Wetzikon 
 

Villages in the canton of Zürich
Wetzikon
Pfäffikersee